Luciana Marcellini (born 12 January 1948) is a retired Italian swimmer. She competed at the 1960 Summer Olympics in the 200 m breaststroke event, but was eliminated in the preliminaries. Aged 12 years and 228 days she was the youngest participant at the 1960 games.

References

Italian female breaststroke swimmers
Swimmers at the 1960 Summer Olympics
1948 births
Living people
Olympic swimmers of Italy
20th-century Italian women